Gotha is a town in Thuringia, Germany.

Gotha may also refer to:

Places
 Gotha (district), in Thuringia, Germany 
 Gotha, Ethiopia
 Gotha, Florida, a town in the United States
 Gotha, Minnesota, an  unincorporated community in the United States
 Saxe-Gotha, a former Thuringian duchy
 Saxe-Gotha-Altenburg, a former Thuringian duchy
 Saxe-Coburg and Gotha, a former Thuringian duchy

Other
 1346 Gotha, a main belt asteroid
 Aechmea 'Gotha', hybrid garden plant
 Almanach de Gotha, an annual directory of European nobility
 Gotha (video game), a strategy game for Sega Saturn
 Gotha Observatory, astronomical observatory in Gotha, Germany
 Gothaer Waggonfabrik, a manufacturer of rolling stock, and formerly also aircraft; notably a series of World War I, heavy bombers 
Gotha G.I
Gotha G.II
Gotha G.III
Gotha G.IV
Gotha G.V
 Gotha Raids, a name for the World War I air raids carried out against Great Britain using Gotha bombers
 Gotha Program (1875), party program for the creation of today's German Social Democratic Party (SPD)

See also 
 Gota (disambiguation)